The Woman of Monte Carlo (Italian: La signora di Montecarlo) is a 1938 Italian "white-telephones" drama film directed by André Berthomieu and Mario Soldati and starring Dita Parlo,  Fosco Giachetti and Jules Berry. A separate French version Unknown of Monte Carlo was released the following year.

It was shot at the Tirrenia Studios in Tuscany.

Cast
 Dita Parlo as Vera
 Fosco Giachetti as Giorgio Duclos  
 Jules Berry as Il conte Messirian  
 Claude Lehmann as Andrea Duclos  
 Danilo Calamai as Il detective 
 Cellio Bucchi 
 Enrico Glori 
 Umberto Melnati as Un banchiere  
 Osvaldo Valenti

References

Bibliography 
 Gianni Amelio. Mario Soldati e il cinema. Donzelli Editore, 2009.

External links 
 

1938 drama films
Italian drama films
1938 films
1930s Italian-language films
Films directed by André Berthomieu
Films directed by Mario Soldati
French drama films
Films shot at Tirrenia Studios
Italian multilingual films
Italian black-and-white films
1938 multilingual films
1930s Italian films
1930s French films